This was the first edition of the tournament.

Misaki Doi and Jil Teichmann won the title after defeating Jamie Loeb and Rebecca Peterson 7–6(7–4), 1–6, [10–8] in the final.

Seeds

Draw

References
 Main Draw

Oracle Challenger Series – Newport Beach
Oracle Challenger Series - Newport Beach - Men's Doubles